Telephone numbers in Switzerland are defined and assigned according to the Swiss telephone numbering plan administered by the Swiss Federal Office of Communications. The plan has been changed several times and the most recent reorganization was implemented in March 2002.

Plan of 2002
The Swiss telephone numbering plan implements the ITU-T recommendation E.164 and is designated E.164/2002, based on its last major revision in 2002. It is a closed numbering plan, which means that all telephone numbers, including the area code, have a fixed number of digits. Swiss area codes are officially termed national destination codes (NDC). A complete telephone number consists of ten digits:  . Two formats are distinguished: three digits for the NDC and seven digits for the subscriber number, and four digits for the NDC and six digits for the subscriber number. However, a few exceptions exist.

The associated dial plan requires that all numbers, even for local calls, must be dialed with the assigned NDC, in contrast to previous plans. When dialing from within the country, a prefix 0 must be dialed.

The plan was amended a few times, e.g., the transition of numbering zone 01 into 044 and 043.

National destination code

The national destination code (NDC) is the area code for Swiss telephone numbers. Within Switzerland the trunk code 0 must be dialed before the NDC, while it is not needed from international locations.

Telephone numbers are portable between numbering zones (ZN) or between mobile operators, and therefore an NDC does not imply that a caller is actually located in a particular zone or is serviced by any particular mobile operator. For landlines it is now merely an indication of the region where the number was originally attributed to a subscriber.

The national destination codes are the following.
21  – ZN Lausanne
22  – ZN Geneva
24  – ZN Yverdon, Aigle
26  – ZN Fribourg
27  – ZN Valais/Wallis
31  – ZN Bern and surrounding areas.
32  – ZN Biel/Bienne, Neuchâtel, Solothurn, Jura
33  – ZN Berner Oberland
34  – ZN Region Bern-Emme
41  – ZN Central Switzerland (Lucerne, Uri, Schwyz, Obwalden, Nidwalden, Zug)
43  – ZN Zurich
44  – ZN Zurich (formerly 1)
51  – rail telecommunication networks (SBB CFF FFS) 
52  – ZN Winterthur, Schaffhausen
55  – ZN Rapperswil
56  – ZN Baden, Zurzach
58  – business telecommunication networks
61  – ZN Region Basel
62  – ZN Region Olten–Langenthal (Oberaargau)–Aargau-West
71  – ZN Region Eastern Switzerland (St. Gallen, Thurgau, Appenzell Ausserrhoden, Appenzell Innerrhoden)
74  – mobile services: paging services
75  – mobile services: GSM / UMTS - Swisscom
76  – mobile services: GSM / UMTS - Sunrise (with MVNOs: Yallo, TalkTalk, Lebara, MTV Mobile, Aldi)
77  – mobile services: GSM / UMTS - various MVNOs: M-Budget (774), Wingo (775), Mucho, Lycamobile (779), ok.-mobile, Tele2
78  – mobile services: GSM / UMTS - Salt (with MVNOs: CoopMobile till 2018-12-31, UPC till 2018-12-31)
79  – mobile services: GSM / UMTS - Swisscom
800 – freephone numbers
81  – ZN Chur
840 – shared-cost numbers
842 – shared-cost numbers
844 – shared-cost numbers
848 – shared-cost numbers
860 – voicemail access (+ 9 digits phone without the initial 0; e.g. +41 860 66 555 44 33 is the voice mail of +41 66 555 44 33)
868 – test numbers - Not accessible from abroad
869 – VPN access code (+ 3 – 10 digits)
878 – personal numbers (UPT)
900 – Premium rate service for business, marketing
901 – Premium rate service for entertainment,
906 – Premium rate service for adult entertainment
91  – ZN Ticino, Moesa
98  – Inter-network routing numbers - Not accessible from abroad - Non diallable
99  – Internal network numbers - Not accessible from abroad - Non diallable

Short codes
Short dialing codes are assigned for special services or network features.

0     – Trunk prefix for calls within Switzerland
00    – International call prefix
1     – Short numbers, see table below (3, 4 or 5 digit length)
107xx – Carrier selection code (+ national or international number)
108xx – Carrier selection code (+ national or international number)
112   – Police
1145  – Directory enquiries for blind/partially sighted (Swisscom)
117   – Police
118   – Fire brigade
140   – Road assistance (TCS)
1414  – Air ambulance (REGA - outside Valais)
1415  – Air ambulance (Air Glaciers - Valais only)
143   – Psychological assistance ("the Helping Hand")
144   – Ambulance
145   – Poisoning/intoxication emergency
147   – Helpline for children
1600  – Regional announcement voice mail
161   – Speaking clock (Shutdown)
163   – Traffic report and travel information
164   – Sport news and lottery
166   – Railway information
176   – Feld Abfrage System
187   – Info about snow avalanches
188   – Info about exhibitions
1802  – Directory enquiries (Tele2, when dialled is rerouted to 1818)
1811  – Directory enquiries (Swisscom)
1818  – Directory enquiries (Sunrise)
1880  – Directory enquiries (Salt)

Alternate proposed plan
Instead of E.164/2002, another more ambitious numbering plan was proposed. In this plan the prefix 0 was discarded, and the area codes were defined differently, with 20 to 49 for geographic areas, 50 to 59 reserved, 60-69 for nationwide numbering, 70-79 for mobile services, 80-89 for shared-cost and toll-free numbers, and 90 for premium-rate services. The plan was not implemented because it required too many phone number and prefix changes, with associated high costs.

Changes

After 2002
The area code 01 was replaced with 044 (Zurich)

Between 1996 to 2002 (plan 2002) 
On 29 March 2002 the Swiss dialing plan changed to a closed dialing plan, i.e. the zone prefix become mandatory also for local calls.

 058 - Corporate access (since 1 June 2000)

Until 1996 (plan 1996)
The previous plan removed a lot of area prefixes and added the seventh digit in phone numbers (usually a phone number (0cc) yx xx xx became (0dd) zzx xx xx).

 023 – Short prefix for some French regions
 025 – Chablais, since 2 November 1996 in 024
 026 – Martigny, since 2 November 1996 in 027
 028 – high Valais, since 2 November 1996 in 027
 029 – Greyerzerland/Pays d'Enhaut, since 2 November 1996 in 026
 030 – Zweisimmen, since 9 November 1996 in 033
 035 – Langnau im Emmental, since 9 November 1996 in 034
 036 – Interlaken, since 9 November 1996 in 033
 037 – Fribourg, since 2 November 1996 in 026
 038 – Neuchâtel, since 9 November 1996 in 032
 039 – La-Chaux-de-Fonds, since 9 November 1996 in 032
 040 – Telepage Swiss (pager)
 042 – Zug, since 23 March 1996 in 041
 043 – Schwyz, since 23 March 1996 in 041
 044 – Altdorf, since 23 March 1996 in 041
 045 – Sursee, since 23 March 1996 in 041
 046 – Toll free, moved into 155 and then into 0800
 051 – Zürich, moved into 01+7 digits, then replaced with 044
 053 – Schaffhausen, since 23 March 1996 in 052
 054 – Frauenfeld, since 23 March 1996 in 052
 057 – Wohlen, since 23 March 1996 in 056
 058 – Glarus, since 23 March 1996 in 055
 059 – Short prefix for German regions, also for parts of France surrounding Geneva and northern Italy
 061 – Basel
 062 – Olten
 063 – Langenthal, withdrawn and integrated into 062 Region Langenthal Oberaargau
 064 – Aarau withdrawn and integrated into 062 Region Aarau, Fricktal
 065 – Solothurn, since 9 November 1996 integrated into 032
 066 – Delémont, since 9 November 1996 integrated into 032
 067 – Short prefix for German/French regions surrounding Basel and Alsace/South-Baden
 068 – Short prefix for some German/French surrounding Basel and Alsace/South-Baden
 069 – Short prefix for some German/French surrounding Basel and Alsace/South-Baden
 071 – St. Gallen, 30 March 1996
 072 – Weinfelden, withdrawn and integrated into 071 Region Weinfelden (Thurgau) since 30 March 1996
 073 – Wil, withdrawn and integrated into 071 Region Wil since 30 March 1996
 074 – Wattwil, withdrawn and integrated into 071 Region Wattwil (Toggenburg) since 30 March 1996
 074 – Pager
 075 – Mobile phone "Natel D" (Swisscom) / previously used for Liechtenstein (Telephone numbers in Liechtenstein) which used to be within the Swiss telephone numbering plan.
 076 – Mobile phone Sunrise
 077 – Mobile phone "Natel C"
 078 – Mobile phone Salt (Orange (telecommunications))
 079 – Mobile phone "Natel D" (Swisscom)
 092 – Bellinzona, Misox and Calanca Valley (GR), withdrawn and integrated into 091 (Ticino)
 093 – Locarno, withdrawn and integrated into 091 (Ticino)
 094 – Leventina Valley, withdrawn and integrated into 091 (Ticino)

Liechtenstein previously used the Swiss telephone numbering plan with the area code 075. (This was dialled as +41 75 from outside Switzerland and Liechtenstein). However, on 5 April 1999, it adopted its own international code +423. Consequently, calls from Switzerland now require international dialling, using the 00423 prefix and the seven-digit number.

Campione d'Italia
The Italian municipality of Campione d'Italia, an exclave within the Swiss canton of Ticino, uses the Swiss telephone network and is part of the Swiss numbering plan, although some Italian numbers are in use by the municipal council, which use the same +39 031 numbering range as the town of Como.

Büsingen am Hochrhein
The German municipality of Büsingen am Hochrhein, an enclave within the canton of Schaffhausen, uses the Swiss telecom network, with numbers having the prefix 052, alongside that of Germany, from which numbers must be dialled in the international format as 004152.

References

Switzerland
Telecommunications in Switzerland
Telephone numbers